The Swimming Australia Hall of Fame was established in 2022 by Swimming Australia "to both recognise and celebrate those athletes and coaches who have left an indelible mark on the sport at the international level." Inaugural inductees - Freddy Lane, Fanny Durack, Dawn Fraser, Shane Gould and Ian Thorpe.
Gould's honour coincided with the 50th anniversary of her first gold medal at the Munich 1972 Olympic Games.

Induction criteria
 "an athlete must have been retired from international competition for at least 5 years and won at least 1 individual Olympic or Paralympic Gold Medal, or multiple FINA or Para World Championships, or Commonwealth Games Gold Medals."  
 "for coaches, elevation to the Hall of Fame can happen at anytime where a coach has provided long and dedicated service to the Dolphins team, has coached an athlete to at least 1 individual Olympic or Paralympic Gold Medal, or multiple FINA or Para World Championships, or Commonwealth Games Gold Medals, and is highly regarded amongst their peers." 
 "both athletes and coaches must also have brought significant international standing to swimming in Australia through their achievements and service."

Inductees

References 

Swimming in Australia
2022 establishments in Australia
Halls of fame in Australia